The following outline is provided as an overview of and topical guide to Anguilla:

Anguilla – one of the most northerly of the Leeward Islands in the Lesser Antilles, lying east of Puerto Rico and the Virgin Islands and directly north of Saint Martin. Anguilla has become a popular tax haven, having no capital gains, estate, profit or other forms of direct taxation on either individuals or corporations.

General reference

 Pronunciation:
 Common English country name: Anguilla
 Official English country name: Anguilla
 Common endonym(s):  
 Official endonym(s):  
 Adjectival(s): Anguillan (disambiguation)
 Demonym(s):
 ISO country codes: AI, AIA, 660
 ISO region codes: See ISO 3166-2:AI
 Internet country code top-level domain: .ai

Geography of Anguilla 

Geography of Anguilla
 Anguilla is: an island and British overseas territory consisting of it and a number of smaller islands and cays.
 Location:
 Northern Hemisphere and Western Hemisphere
 North America (off the East Coast of the United States, southeast of Puerto Rico)
 Atlantic Ocean
 Caribbean
 Antilles
 Lesser Antilles (island chain)
 Leeward Islands
 Time zone:  Eastern Caribbean Time (UTC-04)
 Extreme points of Anguilla
 High:  Crocus Hill 
 Low:  Caribbean Sea 0 m
 Land boundaries:  none
 Coastline:  61 km
 Population of Anguilla: 13,477 (2006) - 212th most populous country
 Area of Anguilla:  - 220th largest country
 Atlas of Anguilla

Environment of Anguilla 

 Climate of Anguilla
 Renewable energy in Anguilla
 Geology of Anguilla
 Protected areas of Anguilla
 Biosphere reserves in Anguilla
 National parks of Anguilla
 Wildlife of Anguilla
 Fauna of Anguilla
 Birds of Anguilla
 Mammals of Anguilla

Natural geographic features of Anguilla 

 Fjords of Anguilla
 Glaciers of Anguilla
 Islands of Anguilla
 Lakes of Anguilla
 Mountains of Anguilla
 Volcanoes in Anguilla
 Rivers of Anguilla
 Waterfalls of Anguilla
 Valleys of Anguilla
 World Heritage Sites in Anguilla: None

Regions of Anguilla 

Regions of Anguilla

Ecoregions of Anguilla 

List of ecoregions in Anguilla

Administrative divisions of Anguilla

Administrative divisions of Anguilla
 Municipalities of Anguilla

Municipalities of Anguilla 

Municipalities of Anguilla
 Capital of Anguilla: The Valley
 Villages of Anguilla

Demography of Anguilla 

Demographics of Anguilla

Government and politics of Anguilla 

Politics of Anguilla
 Form of government: parliamentary representative democratic dependency
 Capital of Anguilla: The Valley
 Elections in Anguilla
 Political parties in Anguilla

Branches of government

Government of Anguilla

Executive branch of the government of Anguilla 
 Head of state: Monarch of the United Kingdom, King Charles III
 Monarch's representative: Governor of Anguilla
 Head of government: Chief Minister of Anguilla
 Cabinet of Anguilla

Legislative branch of the government of Anguilla 

 Anguilla House of Assembly

Judicial branch of the government of Anguilla 

Court system of Anguilla
 Supreme Court of Anguilla

Foreign relations of Anguilla 

Foreign relations of Anguilla
 Diplomatic missions in Anguilla
 Diplomatic missions of Anguilla

International organization membership 
Anguilla is a member of:
Caribbean Community and Common Market (Caricom) (associate)
Caribbean Development Bank (CDB)
International Criminal Police Organization (Interpol) (subbureau)
Organisation of Eastern Caribbean States (OECS)
Universal Postal Union (UPU)
World Federation of Trade Unions (WFTU)

Law and order in Anguilla 

Law of Anguilla

Law Enforcement in Anguilla

Military of Anguilla 

Military of Anguilla
 Anguilla has no military of its own: Anguilla is a protectorate of the United Kingdom (UK), and the UK is responsible for its military defence.
 Command
 Commander-in-chief
 Ministry of Defence of Anguilla
 Forces
 Army of Anguilla: none
 Navy of Anguilla: none
 Air Force of Anguilla: none
 Special forces of Anguilla: none
 Military history of Anguilla
 Military ranks of Anguilla

Local government in Anguilla 

Local government in Anguilla

History of Anguilla 

History of Anguilla
Timeline of the history of Anguilla
Current events of Anguilla
 Military history of Anguilla

Culture of Anguilla 

Culture of Anguilla
 Architecture of Anguilla
 Cuisine of Anguilla
 Festivals in Anguilla
 Languages of Anguilla
 Media in Anguilla
 National symbols of Anguilla
 Coat of arms of Anguilla
 Flag of Anguilla
 National anthem of Anguilla
 People of Anguilla
 Public holidays in Anguilla
 Records of Anguilla
 Religion in Anguilla
 Christianity in Anguilla
 Hinduism in Anguilla
 Islam in Anguilla
 Judaism in Anguilla
 Sikhism in Anguilla
 World Heritage Sites in Anguilla: None

Art in Anguilla 
 Art in Anguilla
 Cinema of Anguilla
 Literature of Anguilla
 Music of Anguilla
 Television in Anguilla
 Theatre in Anguilla

Sports in Anguilla 

Sports in Anguilla
 Football in Anguilla
 Anguilla at the Olympics

Economy and infrastructure of Anguilla 

Economy of Anguilla
 Economic rank, by nominal GDP (2007): 188th (one hundred and eighty eighth)
 Communications in Anguilla
 Internet in Anguilla
 Companies of Anguilla
Currency of Anguilla: Dollar
ISO 4217: XCD
 Anguilla Stock Exchange
 Transport in Anguilla
 Airports in Anguilla

Education in Anguilla 

Education in Anguilla
List of schools in Anguilla
Saint James School of Medicine

See also

Anguilla

Index of Anguilla-related articles
List of Anguilla-related topics
List of international rankings
Outline of geography
Outline of North America
Outline of the Caribbean
Outline of the United Kingdom

References

External links

 Official sites
 Government of Anguilla – Official government web site
 Anguilla Guide – Official publication of the Anguilla Hotel and Tourism Association

 News and media
 A_A News – Online news source in Anguilla
 Portals
 Anguilla. The World Factbook. Central Intelligence Agency.
 

 History
 Imperial History of Anguilla

Anguilla
Anguilla